H.A.T.E.: Hostile All-Terrain Encounter is an isometric scrolling shoot 'em up similar to Sega's Zaxxon, developed by Vortex Software and released in 1989 for Commodore 64, ZX Spectrum, Amstrad CPC, Amiga, and Atari ST. The player can choose to play with either an airplane or a tank.

References

External links
 
 Amiga reviews
 Commodore 64 review at Zzap64.com

1989 video games
Scrolling shooters
Amiga games
Amstrad CPC games
Atari ST games
Commodore 64 games
ZX Spectrum games
Gremlin Interactive games
Video games scored by Ben Daglish
Video games with isometric graphics
Vortex Software games
Video games developed in the United Kingdom